was a Japanese samurai of the Azuchi–Momoyama period through early Edo period. Once the ruler of Tosa Province, his fief was revoked by Tokugawa Ieyasu after the Battle of Sekigahara. His childhood name was Sen'yumaru (千熊丸).

Biography
Morichika was the 4th son of Chōsokabe Motochika. He was named the heir to the Chōsokabe following Chōsokabe Nobuchika's death in 1587 and fought in the Siege of Odawara (1590) and 1st Korean Campaigns (1592-93). 

In 1600, he sided with Ishida Mitsunari and commanded 6,600 men. His troops fought against Ikeda Terumasa at Battle of Sekigahara (though he saw very little action) and was afterwards deprived of his fief despite sending an apology to Tokugawa Ieyasu. That same year, he had ordered the execution of his elder brother Tsuno Chikatada, who had questioned his right to be Motochika's heir, as ruler of Tosa Province. 

In 1614, he went to join the defenders of Osaka Castle against the Tokugawa, he arriving there the same day as Sanada Yukimura. His Chōsokabe contingent fought very well in both the Winter and Summer at Osaka Campaigns. After the fall of Osaka, Morichika attempted to flee but was apprehended at Hachiman-yama by Hachisuka men. He and his sons were beheaded on May 11, 1615, following the defeat of the Toyotomi and Chōsokabe forces at the Battle of Tennōji.

Family
Father: Chōsokabe Motochika (1539–1599)
Mother: Lady Motochika (d. 1583)
Older brother :
Chōsokabe Nobuchika
Kagawa Chikakazu
Wife: Daughter of Chōsokabe Nobuchika
Children:
 Chōsokabe Moritaka (d. 1615)
 Chōsokabe Morisada (d. 1615)
 Chōsokabe Morinobu (d. 1615)
 Chōsokabe Moritsune (d. 1615)
Grandchild: (son of Moritsune) Chōsokabe Moritane (d. 1615)

References

External links
Information on Chōsogabe Morichika

1575 births
1615 deaths
Daimyo
Samurai
Chōsokabe clan
Executed Japanese people
People executed by Japan by decapitation